Newington Archaeological Site is a historic plantation and archaeological site located at King and Queen Courthouse, King and Queen County, Virginia. It was the birthplace and childhood home of Founding Father Carter Braxton, a signatory of the Declaration of Independence. Both the original plantation and its reconstruction had burnt down by the first decade of the 20th century. The property contains both archaeological ruins and surviving landscape elements from the former 18th century plantation. While a stone building is the only above ground 18th century structure remaining, among other ruins, the location of the plantation mansion, two outbuilding foundations, and two cellars have been identified. The existing landscape elements include a cemetery, historic road, and the terraces of a falling garden. The property also contains Native American deposits associated mostly with the Woodland period (1200 BC – AD 1600).

It was listed on the National Register of Historic Places in 2010.

References

Archaeological sites on the National Register of Historic Places in Virginia
Plantations in Virginia
National Register of Historic Places in King and Queen County, Virginia
Homes of United States Founding Fathers